Mẫu Địa Tiên (Chữ Hán: 
母地仙, Mother Goddess of Earth) (not to be mistaken with Quảng Cung or Phật Mẫu Diêu Trì), Mẫu Địa (Chữ Hán: 
母地) also known as Mẫu Địa Phủ  or Lục Cung Thánh Mẫu is one of the Mother Goddesses in Đạo Mẫu (Mother Goddess religion), an indigenous religion of Vietnam. She governs the Earth Palace, one of the Four Palaces which otherwise include Heaven Palace, Mountains and Forests Palace and Water Palace.

The devotees of Đạo Mẫu believe that Mother Goddess Liễu Hạnh is Mẫu Địa Tiên herself. As the representative of Mẫu Thiên Tiên (Mother Goddess of Heaven) on Earth and Mẫu Địa Tiên, she is the primary goddess of Đạo Mẫu.

Because Mẫu Địa Phủ governs the Earth Palace, she is associated with the token color of yellow. Each palace has a representative color.

References

Vietnamese folk religion
Vietnamese goddesses
Vietnamese deities
Vietnamese gods